Arthroleptis phrynoides, the Lomami screeching frog, is a species of frog in the family Arthroleptidae. It is endemic to Democratic Republic of the Congo and is known only from the type locality at Lomami near Lomela Territory.

References

phrynoides
Endemic fauna of the Democratic Republic of the Congo
Amphibians described in 1976
Taxonomy articles created by Polbot
Southern Congolian forest–savanna mosaic
Western Congolian forest–savanna mosaic